Ngozi Ebere (born 5 August 1991) is a Nigerian footballer who plays as a defender for Norwegian club Arna-Bjørnar, and internationally for the Nigeria women's national team. She was a member of the Rivers Angels who won the Nigerian domestic double in 2014, and the Nigerian national women's team who won the 2014 African Women's Championship.

Career

Club
In 2014, Ngozi Ebere was part of the Nigerian domestic team Rivers Angels who won the Nigerian Women Football League and Nigeria Federation Cup double. During the course of the season, Ebere scored seven goals including the third and final goal on the final match of the season in the 3–1 victory over Sunshine Queens.

Ebere was signed by the French team Paris Saint-Germain in September 2015 on a two-year contract. She said at the time, "I am here to give the best of myself and to win trophies, I am very motivated by this new challenge that awaits me here in Paris. It’s a dream come true." She made her debut in a Division 1 Féminine match against Olympique Lyonnais on 27 September 2015. Two months later, she was placed on the five person shortlist for African Women's Footballer of the Year; she suggested that this nomination came as a result of her recent performances. During the course of her first season, she played in eight matches; six in the Division 1 Féminine and two in the Coupe de France Féminine.

The 2017–19 seasons she played in Cyprus at Barcelona FA, before moving on to the Norwegian club Arna-Bjørnar.

International
Ebere was included in the: Nigeria women's national football team at the African Women's Championship in 2012; the title winning team of 2014, and the squad at the 2015 FIFA Women's World Cup.

Honours

Club
 Rivers Angels
Nigerian Women Football League (1): 2014
Nigeria Federation Cup (1): 2014

International
 Nigeria
 African Women's Championship (2): 2014, 2016

References

External links
 
 

1991 births
Living people
Rivers Angels F.C. players
Women's association football defenders
2015 FIFA Women's World Cup players
Nigerian women's footballers
Nigeria women's international footballers
Paris Saint-Germain Féminine players
Nigerian expatriate women's footballers
Division 1 Féminine players
Nigerian expatriate sportspeople in France
Nigerian expatriate sportspeople in Cyprus
Nigerian expatriate sportspeople in Norway
Sportspeople from Port Harcourt
Expatriate women's footballers in France
Expatriate women's footballers in Cyprus
Expatriate women's footballers in Norway
2019 FIFA Women's World Cup players
Barcelona FA players